Waterborough is a civil parish in Queens County, New Brunswick, Canada.

For governance purposes it forms the local service district of the parish of Waterborough, which is a member of Regional Service Commission 11 (RSC11).

Origin of name
The parish was said locally to describe the terrain. The original boundaries surrounded Grand Lake.

History
Waterborough was erected in 1786 as one of the county's original parishes. It completely surrounded Grand Lake and extended past the county line.

In 1827 Canning Parish was erected from Waterborough.

In 1852 part of Waterborough was included in the newly erected Cambridge Parish.

In 1855 Waterborough was expanded to the northwest, adding all of Chipman Parish southeast of Coal Creek.

In 1856 the boundary with Cambridge was adjusted.

In 1896 Waterborough was expanded northwest to reach the county line, taking part of Chipman.

Boundaries
Waterborough Parish is bounded:

 on the northeast by the Kent County line;
 on the southeast by a line running north 54º east from a point on the Saint John River about 1.8 kilometres southwest of the Route 715 bridge over McAlpines Brook, which then strikes the Kent County line north of Lake Stream Lake;
 on the southwest by Fowler Road and Mill Cove;
 on the west by Grand Lake;
 on the northwest by a line running through the Northeast Arm of Grand Bay, then up Coal Creek past the mouth of the South Branch Coal Creek to the southeastern corner of a grant to Malcolm Carmichael at a stretch called the Round Turns, then northeasterly parallelling the southeastern line of the parish to the county line;
 including Goat Island in Grand Lake.

Communities
Communities at least partly within the parish. bold indicates an incorporated municipality; italics indicate a name no longer in official use

 Cambridge-Narrows
 Cox Point
 Cumberland Bay
 Dixon
 Grant Settlement
 Mill Cove
 Pangburn
 Partridge Valley
 Pennlyn
 Rees
 The Range
 Union Settlement
  Waterborough
 Youngs Cove

Bodies of water
Bodies of water at least partly within the parish.

 Cumberland Bay Stream
 Coal Creek
 Youngs Creek
 Barton Lake
 Cameron Lake
 McLean Lake
 Grand Lake
 Cumberland Bay
 Northeast Arm

Islands
Islands at least partly within the parish.
 Goat Island

Other notable places
Parks, historic sites, and other noteworthy places at least partly within the parish.
 Partridge Valley West Protected Natural Area
 West Branch Coy Brook Protected Natural Area

Demographics
Parish population total does not include portion within Cambridge-Narrows

Population
Population trend

Language
Mother tongue (2016)

Access Routes
Highways and numbered routes that run through the parish, including external routes that start or finish at the parish limits:

Highways
none

Principal Routes

Secondary Routes:

External Routes:
None

See also
List of parishes in New Brunswick

Notes

References

Local service districts of Queens County, New Brunswick
Parishes of Queens County, New Brunswick